The Bulwell Academy (formerly Riverleen School) is a large academy situated in Bulwell, Nottingham, England, an area of social deprivation. It has strong business and industry links and specialises in Business & Enterprise.

About The Bulwell Academy
The Bulwell Academy caters for 1,050 11- to 16-year-olds with up to a further 250 places for post-16 students. The academy has a business and enterprise specialism and has local business partnerships.

The multimillion-pound building, opened in 2010, has a modern design including a number of environmental sustainability features. On arrival at The Bulwell Academy students are confronted by a large, glass-fronted Enterprise Hub – a key design feature to emphasise the academy’s business and enterprise specialism.  A central courtyard area is sheltered by a tented roofing system where rainwater is collected and used as ‘grey’ water to flush the toilets. Another unusual feature is the roof area, which is  80 per cent covered in sedum – a moss-type plant – to help reduce incoming noise and minimise rain water run-off.

Academy Sponsors

Creative Education Trust
Creative Education Trust Started sponsoring The Bulwell Academy in 2019 with The Bulwell Academy Trust.

Feeder Schools
Snapewood Primary School
Bulwell St Mary's C Of E Primary School
Rufford Primary & Nursery School
Springfield Academy
Cantrell Primary & Nursery School
Crabtree Farm Primary School
St. Mary's Primary School

References

The References of the school are:

Outstanding Teachers.
comfortable environment.
Great education.

External links
 www.bulwellacademy.co.uk
 www.bulwellacademytrust.co.uk (2008)
 www.edge.co.uk Edge Academies

Secondary schools in Nottingham
Educational institutions established in 2008
Academies in Nottingham
2009 establishments in England